Jeevana Chakra is a 1985 Kannada-language film starring Vishnuvardhan, Raadhika and Ramesh Bhat, and directed by H. R. Bhargava. The film was a remake of the 1983 Telugu film Dharmaatmudu.

Cast 

Vishnuvardhan as Ranganath
Raadhika as Uma
Vijayakashi as Vinod
Saroja as Priya
Ramesh Bhat 
C. R. Simha as Security officer Jagadeesh
Sudheer
Chi Udayashankar
Shankar Rao
Jayamalini
Anuradha
Janaki
B. Jayashree
Bharani
Shivaprakash
Suryakumar
Bemel Somanna
Janardhan
Ramdas
Shankar Patil
Karanth
Prakash
Phani Ramachandra
Swagath Jayaram
Roger Narayan as Krishna

Soundtrack 
The music was composed by Rajan–Nagendra.

References

External links 
 

1985 films
Indian drama films
Kannada remakes of Telugu films
1980s Kannada-language films
Films scored by Rajan–Nagendra
Films directed by H. R. Bhargava